Bruce Smith Hitt (March 14, 1897 – November 10, 1973) was a pitcher in Major League Baseball. He played for the St. Louis Cardinals in 1917.

References

External links

1897 births
1973 deaths
Major League Baseball pitchers
St. Louis Cardinals players
Sherman Browns players
Baseball players from Texas
Burials at Willamette National Cemetery
People from Comanche, Texas